Ermete Zacconi (14 September 1857, Montecchio Emilia, Province of Reggio Emilia – 14 October 1948 in Viareggio) was an Italian stage and film actor and a representative of naturalism and verism in acting. His leading ladies on stage were his wife  and Paola Pezzaglia.

His wife Ines Cristina was born into a family of theater actors to Maltese actor Raffaello Cristina and Italian actress Cesira Sabatini. The actor Olinto Cristina and the actresses Ada Cristina Almirante and Jone Frigerio were her siblings. She was previously married to prompter Ambrogio Bagni (pseudonym of Ambrogio Bagna) with whom she had had a daughter Margherita Bagni, also an actress. Zacconi and his wife had a daughter together Ernes Zacconi.

He had lead roles in plays by William Shakespeare, Carlo Goldoni, Alfred de Musset, Henrik Ibsen, August Strindberg. He also performed in films. His most notable film roles include L'emigrante (1915), Cardinal Lambertini, (1934)Summer Rain (1937), The Pearls of the Crown (1937), Processo e morte di Socrate (1939), and Le Comte de Monte Cristo (1943).

Filmography

References

External links
 

1857 births
1948 deaths
20th-century Italian male actors
Italian male film actors
Italian male silent film actors
Italian male stage actors
People from the Province of Reggio Emilia
Volpi Cup for Best Actor winners